Capt Thomas Hope (3 February 1848 – 28 March 1925) was the Tory MP for Linlithgowshire, winning it in the 1893 by-election and resigning it in 1895. In Freemasonry, he was also Provincial Grand Master of the Provincial Grand Lodge of Linlithgowshire from 1894 to 1904.  Thomas Hope was elected to the newly created Linlithgowshire County Council (for Torphichen Parish) in 1889 and became its first County Convener.

References

External links 
 

1848 births
1925 deaths
Scottish Tory MPs (pre-1912)
UK MPs 1892–1895
19th-century Scottish people